Mourning Noise was an American horror- and hardcore punk band from Lodi, New Jersey, notable for drummer Steve Zing. Active around the time of the Misfits, Mourning Noise were strongly influenced by the Misfits as drummer Steve Zing lived very close to Jerry Only and Doyle's house and Steve went to high school with Doyle. Their music was typically fast and melodic.
Mourning Noise released only a small amount of material, typically as 7-inch singles, apart from the 1998 collection album Death Trip Delivery. Steve later went on to play for Samhain, Son of Sam, The Undead, Chyna, Doomtree, and later, Danzig.

Samhain guitarist Damien was briefly a member of the band.

Members
2021- lineup
 Robby Bloodshed - Vocals, Guitar
 Chris Morance - Bass
 Tommy Koprowski - Guitar
 Steve Zing - Drums

Past members
 Peter “Damien” Marshall

Discography
 1983 - Dawn of the Dead 7-inch (EP)
 1986 - Runaway (Steve Zing solo, recorded with Mourning Noise members) 7-inch (single)
 1990 - Live Nightmares split 7-inch with the parasites.
 Death Trip Delivery: 1981 - 1985 CD (Grand Theft Audio, 1998) - posthumous compilation
 2022 - …at the Seville 7-inch (EP)

References

External links
 Mourning Noise at Misfits Central

Hardcore punk groups from New Jersey
Horror punk groups